The Leonardo Da Vinci University is a Peruvian private university founded on April 1, 2010, in the city of Trujillo, La Libertad Region. This institution of higher learning has its headquarters in the city of Trujillo.

History
The Leonardo Da Vinci University was authorized to develop its academic activities in the city of Trujillo on April 8, 2010, the operation was authorized by Resolution No. 202-2010-CONAFU.

Careers
Business Management and Services
Accounting and Corporate Finance
Law and Business
Systems Engineering and Information Technology
Marketing and International Business.

See also
National University of Trujillo
Cesar Vallejo University
Private University of the North

References

External links
official Website (Spanish)

Universities in Trujillo, Peru